Antonio Hidalgo Morilla (born 6 February 1979) is a Spanish former footballer who played as a central midfielder, currently manager of Sevilla Atlético.

Over 17 seasons as a professional, he appeared in 412 games in the Segunda División, scoring 57 goals for six clubs, mainly Tenerife (five years) and Sabadell (four). In La Liga, he represented Tenerife, Málaga and Osasuna.

Playing career
Born in Granollers, Barcelona, Catalonia, Hidalgo began starting professionally with FC Barcelona's reserves, then went on to represent CD Tenerife for five seasons. After being an important element during the team's 2001 promotion, he played ten games in the following campaign's La Liga.

Hidalgo moved to Málaga CF in the summer of 2005, appearing in 35 matches in his first year as the Andalusia side finished bottom and were relegated. On 15 June 2008, he scored two goals in a 2–1 victory over former club Tenerife, granting top-flight promotion after a two-year absence at the expense of Real Sociedad; he finished the season with 14 league goals, best in the squad.

Hidalgo stayed in the Segunda División, however, signing a two-year deal with Real Zaragoza. In late January 2009, he joined struggling CA Osasuna on loan until the end of the campaign, and appeared regularly although very rarely as a starter as the Navarrese eventually stayed in the top division.

Upon his return to Aragon, Hidalgo was deemed surplus to requirements. In the dying minutes of the August 2009 transfer window he arranged a 1+1 deal with second-tier club Albacete Balompié; at the end of his only season, the 31-year-old was one of 14 players who were not given a contract extension, being released.

Hidalgo then had a spell at CD Tenerife, suffering relegation in his sole season before joining CE Sabadell FC of his native region in January 2012, shortly before turning 33. In March 2014, the captain extended his stay with the Arlequinats for another year. When his contract ended, he played for several weeks with UE Cornellà in the Segunda División B before retiring in November 2015, immediately becoming a youth team coach.

Coaching career
In April 2016, Hidalgo assumed his first senior management job at EC Granollers. He left the Tercera División side at the end of the campaign a month later, joining his compatriot Imanol Idiakez's staff at AEK Larnaca FC in the Cypriot First Division.

Hidalgo left his Larnaca contract a year early in April 2019, tasked with keeping former club Sabadell in the third level with seven games to go. He ended a five-year exile from the second tier on 26 July 2020, with a 2–1 playoff final win over Barcelona B.

On 20 November 2021, with the team in the Primera División RFEF relegation places, Hidalgo was dismissed.

Managerial statistics

References

External links

1979 births
Living people
Footballers from Granollers
Spanish footballers
Association football midfielders
La Liga players
Segunda División players
Segunda División B players
Tercera División players
FC Barcelona C players
FC Barcelona Atlètic players
CD Tenerife players
Málaga CF players
Real Zaragoza players
CA Osasuna players
Albacete Balompié players
CE Sabadell FC footballers
UE Cornellà players
Spain youth international footballers
Spanish football managers
Segunda División managers
Segunda División B managers
Tercera División managers
Primera Federación managers
Segunda Federación managers
CE Sabadell FC managers
Sevilla Atlético managers
Spanish expatriate sportspeople in Cyprus